The Western Maryland Scenic Railroad (WMSR) is a heritage railroad based in Cumberland, Maryland, that operates passenger excursion trains and occasional freight trains using both steam and diesel locomotives over ex-Western Maryland Railway (WM) tracks between Cumberland and Frostburg. The railroad offers coach and first class service, murder mystery excursions, and special seasonal trips.

Rail line history and description
The Western Maryland (WM) was a railroad that served Cumberland, Maryland, along with a branch line that ran between there and Frostburg, as well as stretching to other small towns, like Hancock and Connellsville. In 1973, the WM joined the Baltimore and Ohio and Chesapeake and Ohio railroads to group into the Chessie System, which would eventually be completely merged into the new CSX transportation system. The Cumberland-Frostburg branch was subsequently abandoned. In the late 1980s, the city of Cumberland started seeing the old branch line as a possible tourist attraction, so a joint effort was formed; Allegheny County contributed $585,000, the city $2,470,560, and the city of Frostburg $338,427 to purchase the corridor. As part of the deal, the newly formed Scenic Railroad Development Corporation (SRDC) was given the old WM shops in Ridgeley, West Virginia, a 1913 station in Cumberland, and an 1891 Cumberland & Pennsylvania wooden depot in Frostburg. From 1989 to 1991, the trackage was used by the Allegany Central Railroad before the SRDC began operations themselves as the WMSR.

WMSR's excursion trains start in Cumberland at the Western Maryland Railway Station. Built in 1913, the station also houses one of the six Chesapeake and Ohio Canal National Historical Park visitor centers as well as other attractions and offices. From there, the trains follow a former Western Maryland Railway line northwest through the Cumberland Narrows, a deep water gap formed by the passage of Wills Creek between Haystack Mountain and Wills Mountain, parts of the Wills Mountain Anticline geological structure. They then proceed up the Allegheny Front through a water gap formed by Jennings Run, pass Mt. Savage, and terminate at the former Cumberland and Pennsylvania Railroad depot in Frostburg, where they lay over for about 90 minutes to allow passengers to visit the town while the locomotive is reversed on a turntable that originally served the Western Maryland in Elkins, West Virginia. The train then returns to Cumberland by the same route.

Intermediate sights on the line include:
 Helmstetter's Curve in Cash Valley   
 Brush Tunnel   
 Woodcock Hollow, site of a hairpin curve   

The Allegheny Highlands Trail of Maryland, part of the Great Allegheny Passage bicycle trail between Cumberland and Pittsburgh, Pennsylvania, parallels the WMSR. Cyclists can make reservations with the railroad to put their bikes on board for the climb up the mountain to Frostburg, then cycle back down to Cumberland.

On August 24, 2021, the railroad appointed a new executive director, Wesley Heinz. Heinz came into the position with a mission to rebuild and reimagine the entire organization. The new administration implemented a plan which resulted in the completion of locomotive No. 1309's restoration, as well as an increase of ridership, revenue. Thanks to this change, the line now sees more passenger traffic than it ever has in its history.

Shops
The WMSR operates out of the former WM's Ridgeley, West Virginia, car shops located just across the Potomac River from Cumberland. The shops include offices, a Federal Railroad Administration building, and the former paint shop which is now used to house the steam engine and perform repairs on the railroad's equipment. The WMSR shops also serve as a business offering restoration services for locomotives and coaches from both commercial and private owners. South, past the Ridgely shops and yard, the WMSR maintains a wye that is used to turn the railroad's locomotives and coaches.

Passenger and freight equipment
Since its creation, the WMSR has gained an extensive collection of light weight style passenger coaches, many of which it either has restored to service in its green and gold livery, or has used for parts to restore other coaches. Many of the restored coaches are painted with the names of local area towns, as well as benefactors of the scenic railroad. The WMSR also has a collection of freight equipment it has collected from CSX and other sources that it uses for storage at the shops, rail line maintenance, and photo freight excursions. The WMSR currently also has three cabooses. They are two ex-C&O cabooses and one ex-WM caboose. Other un-restored equipment includes an ex-Chessie System crane, ex-Amtrak material handling cars, heavyweight coaches and pieces for a turntable.

Equipment

Locomotives

Former units

Gallery

See also

Canal Place (park complex which includes the railway station)
List of heritage railroads in the United States

References

Further reading

External links

  Western Maryland Scenic Railroad
 HawkinsRails' Western Maryland Scenic scrapbook
 The Western Maryland Railway Station in Cumberland is at 

Cumberland, Maryland
Heritage railroads in Maryland
Museums in Allegany County, Maryland
Railroad museums in Maryland
Transportation in Cumberland, MD-WV-PA
Tourist attractions in Cumberland, MD-WV-PA
Transportation in Allegany County, Maryland